Mars is a 1930 short animated film in the Oswald the Lucky Rabbit series.

Plot
Oswald and a big badger are sitting on a bench in a park. Momentarily a pretty female cat walks around and sings the song A Bench in the Park (this song was used earlier in King of Jazz). When she drops a handkerchief, Oswald and the badger rush to pick it up. Upon picking, they pulled the handkerchief until it is rip apart. When the cat passes by again, Oswald snags part of the badger's clothing onto a nail on the bench. The badger rushes again and ends up wearing just his undergarments. Oswald then approaches the cat as the other guy runs away in embarrassment. But before he could spend a long time with her, the badger returns in a wine barrel before kicking Oswald in the rear. The kick is so strong that Oswald is sent into space.

Following a long trip after being booted, Oswald finds himself landing on the planet Mars. He encounters a lot of bizarre animals before meeting their king. When the Martian king asks for his identity, Oswald introduces himself by singing his theme song. The king likes his song, and so do the bizarre animals. After everybody parties around for several moments, a giant spider-like creature comes to the scene. All the other animals run away, including Oswald. Oswald continues to run until he reaches an edge. Without any other place to go, the rabbit is forced to jump. Oswald falls and finds himself moving in space again. On the way, he finds a meteoroid which he rides on.

Back on Earth, the badger and the cat are recently married as they walk around in their wedding outfits in the park. The cat, however, does not seem to enjoy her newfound relationship. Suddenly, Oswald's meteoroid drops by, striking and knocking the badger unconscious, later knocked Oswald for a second. The cat appears to be overjoyed by the sight as the badger got knocked out, laying down on the sidewalk, and the cat and Oswald walks towards the badger's stomach and gives Oswald a kiss. Later, the cat goes on to date Oswald.

References

External links
Mars at the Big Cartoon Database

1930 films
1930 animated films
1930s American animated films
1930s animated short films
1930s science fiction films
American black-and-white films
Films directed by Walter Lantz
Oswald the Lucky Rabbit cartoons
Universal Pictures animated short films
Mars in film
Walter Lantz Productions shorts
Animated films about animals
American science fiction films
1930 short films